Maskun Rural District is a rural district (dehestan) in Jebalbarez District, Jiroft County, Kerman Province, Iran. At the 2006 census, its population was 3,290, in 773 families. The rural district has 68 villages.

References 

Rural Districts of Kerman Province
Jiroft County